My American Wife may refer to:
 My American Wife (1922 film), an American silent drama film
 My American Wife (1936 film), an American comedy film